Rhee Jhoon-goo (January 7, 1932 – April 30, 2018), commonly known as Jhoon Rhee or Grandmaster Jhoon Rhee, was a South Korean master of Taekwondo who is widely recognized as the 'Father of American Taekwondo' for introducing this martial art to the United States of America since arriving in the 1950s. He was ranked 10th dan.

Early life and education
Rhee was born on January 7, 1932, in Korea, during the period of Japanese occupation. He began training in the martial arts at the age of 13 in 1945 without his father's knowledge. Rhee received martial art training under Nam Tae Hi and graduated from the Chung Do Kwan.  While an officer in the Korean Army, he traveled to attend Southwest Texas State College in 1956, and later returned to attend the University of Texas at Austin for an engineering degree.

Career
During the 1960s, Rhee befriended Bruce Lee—a relationship from which they both benefited as martial artists. Lee taught Rhee an extraordinarily fast punch that is almost impossible to block. Rhee named this the "Accupunch".  During his educational years in Texas, Rhee issued his first US-awarded black belt to Pat Burleson, and his first fully US-trained to Allen Steen, who together teamed up to establish the influential Southwest Black Belt Association (later became the American Black Belt Association) resulting in many competition champions.  Rhee upon graduation relocated to the East Coast and opened his first U.S. based studio in 1962 in Washington, DC, and over time expanded to 11 studios in the DC Metro area.

In 1973, Rhee made his only martial arts movie, titled When Taekwondo Strikes; he was also in a very small role in Fist of Fury.. In 1975 Rhee met Muhammad Ali before Ali's Thrilla in Manila fight with Joe Frazier. Rhee demonstrated the Accupunch to Ali, who was unable to block it and asked to be taught it. Rhee was Ali's head coach for Ali's fights with Richard Dunn (boxer) and Antonio Inoki.

In the mid-1980s, Rhee operated a network of 11 martial arts studios across the Washington D.C. region.  Rhee was well known in the Washington, D.C. area for a television commercial that has a jingle by Nils Lofgren and features Rhee's daughter uttering the catch phrase, "Nobody bothers me," followed by his son saying "Nobody bothers me, either." In 2000, Rhee was the only Korean-American named amongst the 203 most recognized immigrants to the country by the National Immigrant Forum and the Immigration and Naturalization Services.

Rhee was inducted into the Taekwondo Hall of Fame in 2007, in which he is listed as both the 'Pioneer of American Taekwondo' and the 'Pioneer of Taekwon-Do in Russia'. Rhee is listed as a pioneer in the USA (1950s, 1960s, and 1970s) in Chang Keun Choi's list of taekwondo pioneers.

Death
Rhee died on April 30, 2018 in Arlington, Virginia at the age of 86.

See also 
 List of taekwondo grandmasters

Notes

References

External links 
 Jhoon Rhee Institute of Tae Kwon Do
 

 

1932 births
2018 deaths
Martial arts school founders
Martial arts writers
South Korean Jeet Kune Do practitioners
South Korean male taekwondo practitioners
South Korean tang soo do practitioners
20th-century philanthropists
People from Asan